The 1948 Nevada Wolf Pack football team was an American football team that represented the University of Nevada as an independent during the 1948 college football season. In its second season under head coach Joe Sheeketski, the Wolf Pack compiled a 9–2 record, outscored opponents 480 to 133, and lost to Villanova 27–7 in the Harbor Bowl at San Diego.

Stan Heath and Alva Tabor played quarterback for Nevada this season. Tabor was one of the first African-Americans to play quarterback for a major college football team. Heath was fifth in the balloting for the Heisman Trophy.

Schedule

References

Nevada
Nevada Wolf Pack football seasons
Nevada Wolf Pack football